Chris Guillebeau (born April 4, 1978) is an American author, entrepreneur, blogger, and speaker. He initially received attention for his entrepreneurship and travel blog, The Art of Non-Conformity, which led to the publication of a book of the same name in 2010. Since then, he has published six additional books including The $100 Startup (2012), Side Hustle (2017), and most recently, The Money Tree (2020), his first novel. He also organizes the annual World Domination Summit in Portland, Oregon and hosts the daily podcast, Side Hustle School.

Early life and education
 
Guillebeau was born on April 4, 1978. When he was six years old, he and his mother moved to the Philippines and lived there for two years. As a teenager, Guillebeau dropped out of high school, but began attending college classes at age 16. He earned credits from multiple schools, ultimately graduating with a bachelor's degree from Athens State University in two and a half years. He then started graduate school at age 20 and operated a small wholesale business to fund his schooling.
 
From 2002 to 2006, he volunteered with the medical charity, Mercy Ships, in West Africa. After returning to the United States, he continued his graduate school studies, earning a Master of Arts degree in International Studies from the University of Washington in 2008.

Career
 
In 2008, Guillebeau founded the blog, The Art of Non-Conformity, which discusses a number of topics including entrepreneurship, self-employment, and travel. In June 2008, he released a free e-book through the blog entitled A Brief Guide to World Domination, which was ultimately downloaded over 100,000 times. Also in 2008, Guillebeau started using his blog to document his own goal of traveling to all 193 countries in the world by his 35th birthday in April 2013. The trips were funded primarily through self-employment income, accumulated airline miles, and other travel reward programs. He visited the last country on his list, Norway, on his 35th birthday.
 
During his travels, Guillebeau also engaged in other ventures. In 2010, he founded the Travel Hacking Cartel, a subscription service that provided prospective travelers with information on frequent-flyer programs and other travel deals. In September of that year, he published his first book, The Art of Non-Conformity, through Penguin. To promote the book, he went on a four-month tour (known as the "Unconventional Book Tour") to every U.S. state and Canadian province. 20% of the book's proceeds were donated to Charity:Water.
 
In 2011, he organized the inaugural World Domination Summit (WDS), an annual conference based in Portland, Oregon that is aimed at individuals with non-traditional career paths. Over the course of its existence, the WDS has had over 10,000 attendees with notable speakers including Brené Brown, Scott Harrison, and Gretchen Rubin (among others). At the second WDS event in 2012, Guillebeau gave all attendees a $100 bill to use on entrepreneurial ventures or charitable donations. In May of that year, he also released his second book, The $100 Startup, via Crown Business. It reached number 6 in its respective category on The New York Times Best Seller list. In 2013, Guillebeau started the foundation, Scholarships for Real Life, via WDS. Accepted applicants can receive as much as $12,000 in grant money to pursue their projects.
 
In September 2014, Guillebeau released his third book, The Happiness of Pursuit. His fourth book, Born For This, was released on April 5, 2016. To promote that book, he went on a 30-city tour throughout the United States. In January 2017, Guillebeau started the Side Hustle School podcast and online workshop. The podcast features stories of people who complement their traditional jobs with additional income sources ("side hustles"). The online workshop provides users with tools and information to create their own side hustles. Later in 2017, Guillebeau published his fifth book, Side Hustle: From Idea To Income In 27 Days. Another book, 100 Side Hustles, was released in June 2019 and featured 100 stories collected from the Side Hustle School podcast.
 
In April 2020, Guillebeau published his first novel, The Money Tree. As of 2020, he continues to host a daily episode of his podcast, Side Hustle School, and has written for numerous publications, including BusinessWeek, The Oregonian, The New York Times, and others.

Bibliography 
Guillebeau has released seven books as of December 2020.

References

External links
 Official website
 chrisguillebeau on Twitter
 World Domination Summit
 

 

Living people
American male bloggers
American bloggers
American business writers
1978 births
University of Washington alumni
21st-century American non-fiction writers